A494 may refer to:

 A494 road
 RFA Salvalour (A494), a ship